Dune: Part Two is an upcoming American epic science fiction film directed by Denis Villeneuve from a screenplay by Villeneuve, Jon Spaihts, and Eric Roth. The direct sequel to the 2021 film, it is the second of a two-part adaptation of the 1965 novel Dune by Frank Herbert and will cover roughly the second half of the book. Timothée Chalamet, Rebecca Ferguson, Josh Brolin, Stellan Skarsgård, Dave Bautista, Stephen McKinley Henderson, Zendaya, Charlotte Rampling, and Javier Bardem reprise their roles from the first film, with Florence Pugh, Austin Butler, Christopher Walken, Léa Seydoux, Souheila Yacoub, and Tim Blake Nelson joining the ensemble cast.

Development began after Legendary Entertainment acquired film and TV rights for Dune in 2016. Villeneuve signed on as director for the film in 2017, with the intention of making a two-part adaptation of the novel. Production contracts were only secured for a first film, with the second film having to be green-lit based on the first's success. Though Villeneuve was concerned about the sequel's certainty after the first film had a simultaneous theatrical and HBO Max release, Warner Bros. assured him the sequel would happen if it performed well on HBO Max. After the critical and commercial success of the first film, Warner Bros. and Legendary Entertainment green-lit the film in October 2021. New cast members including Pugh, Butler, Walken, Seydoux, and Yacoub were announced in 2022, followed by Nelson a year later. Filming took place in Budapest, Italy and Abu Dhabi between July and December 2022.

Dune: Part Two is set to be released on November 3, 2023.

Premise 
The film will explore the continuing journey of Paul Atreides who is united with Chani and the Fremen. He seeks revenge against the conspirators who destroyed his family. He seems to face a choice between the love of his life and the fate of the known universe; he endeavors to prevent a terrible future that apparently only he can predict.

Cast 

 Timothée Chalamet as Paul Atreides, the duke of House Atreides, who is called "Muad'Dib" by the Fremen
 Rebecca Ferguson as Lady Jessica, Paul's Bene Gesserit mother and concubine to Paul's late father, Leto
 Josh Brolin as Gurney Halleck, the weapons master of House Atreides and Paul's mentor
 Stellan Skarsgård as Baron Vladimir Harkonnen, sworn enemy to Leto and former steward of Arrakis
 Dave Bautista as Glossu Rabban, the brutish nephew of Baron Harkonnen
 Stephen McKinley Henderson as Thufir Hawat, a Mentat loyal to House Atreides
 Zendaya as Chani, a young Fremen woman and Paul's love interest
 Charlotte Rampling as Gaius Helen Mohiam, a Bene Gesserit Reverend Mother and the Emperor's Truthsayer
 Javier Bardem as Stilgar, leader of the Fremen tribe at Sietch Tabr

 Florence Pugh as Princess Irulan, the Emperor's daughter
 Austin Butler as Feyd-Rautha, Baron Harkonnen's younger nephew and planned successor on Arrakis
 Christopher Walken as Shaddam IV, the Emperor of House Corrino
 Léa Seydoux as Lady Margot, a Bene Gesserit and close friend of the Emperor
 Souheila Yacoub as Shishakli, a Fremen warrior

Additionally, Tim Blake Nelson is cast in an undisclosed role.

Production

Development 
In March 2018, Denis Villeneuve stated that his goal was to adapt the novel into a two-part film series. Villeneuve ultimately secured a two-film deal with Warner Bros. Pictures, in the same style as the two-part adaption of Stephen King's It in 2017 and 2019. He stated that "I would not agree to make this adaptation of the book with one single movie" as Dune was "too complex" with "power in details" that a single film would fail to capture. In January 2019, Joe Walker was confirmed to be serving as the film's editor. Other crew included Brad Riker as supervising art director, Patrice Vermette as production designer, Paul Lambert as visual effects supervisor, Gerd Nefzer as special effects supervisor, and Thomas Struthers as stunt coordinator. Dune: Part Two will be produced by Villeneuve, Mary Parent, and Cale Boyter, with Tanya Lapointe, Brian Herbert, Byron Merritt, Kim Herbert, Thomas Tull, Jon Spaihts, Richard P. Rubinstein, John Harrison, and Herbert W. Gain serving as executive producers and Kevin J. Anderson as creative consultant. Legendary CEO Joshua Grode confirmed in April 2019 that they plan to make a sequel, adding that "there's a logical place to stop the [first] movie before the book is over".

In December 2020, Villeneuve stated that due to Warner Bros. plan to release the film in theaters and on HBO Max simultaneously, the first film could underperform financially, resulting in cancellation of the planned sequel. In an IMAX screening of the first film's first ten minutes, the title logo read Dune: Part One, lending credence to plans for the sequel. By August 2021, Villeneuve spoke more confidently about the chances of a sequel film, iterating his excitement to work with Timothée Chalamet and Zendaya again, while stating Chani will have a bigger role in the sequel. Warner Bros. assured Villeneuve a sequel will be greenlit as long as the film performs well on HBO Max. Just days prior to the first film's release, Warner Bros. CEO Ann Sarnoff stated, "Will we have a sequel to Dune? If you watch the movie you see how it ends. I think you pretty much know the answer to that."

On October 26, 2021, Legendary officially green-lit Dune: Part Two with a spokesperson for the company stating "We would not have gotten to this point without the extraordinary vision of Denis and the amazing work of his talented crew, the writers, our stellar cast, our partners at Warner Bros., and of course the fans! Here's to more Dune." A key point of negotiation prior to greenlighting the sequel was assuring that the sequel would have an exclusive window where it would only be shown theatrically, with Legendary and Warner Bros. agreeing to give Dune: Part Two a 45-day window before it would be available through other channels. Villeneuve said this theatrical exclusivity was a "non-negotiable condition", and that "the theatrical experience is at the very heart of the cinematic language for me." With Dune: Part Two greenlit, Villeneuve said that his primary concern was to complete the filming as soon as possible, with the earliest he expected to start in the last quarter of 2022. However, he did say the production of the second film benefited from all the work already established on the first and can help expedite production.

Writing 
Eric Roth was hired to co-write the screenplay in April 2017, and Jon Spaihts was later confirmed to be co-writing the script alongside Roth and Villeneuve. Game of Thrones language creator David Peterson was confirmed to be developing languages for the film in April 2019. In November 2019, Spaihts stepped down as showrunner on the Dune: The Sisterhood TV prequel series to focus on Dune: Part Two. In June 2020, Greig Fraser said, "It's a fully formed story in itself with places to go. It's a fully standalone epic film that people will get a lot out of when they see it". In February 2021, Eric Roth stated that he has written a full treatment for the potential sequel. In August 2021, Villeneuve also confirmed writing on it began. He confirmed that Feyd-Rautha would appear in the film, and stated he will be a "very, very important character". In March 2022, Villeneuve revealed the screenplay is mostly finished.

Casting 

In March 2022, Florence Pugh and Austin Butler were reported to be in talks to star in the film as Princess Irulan and Harkonnen heir Feyd-Rautha, respectively. In May, Christopher Walken joined the cast as Shaddam IV. In June, Léa Seydoux entered negotiations to join the cast as Lady Margot. In July, Souheila Yacoub joined the cast as Shishakli. In January 2023, Tim Blake Nelson was added to the cast in an undisclosed role.

Filming 

Pre-shooting had commenced on July 4, 2022, at the Brion tomb in Altivole, Italy, for two days. Principal photography was set to begin on July 21 in Budapest, Hungary, but began earlier on July 18. By October 2022, Chalamet had taken a break from filming in order to attend the premiere for Bones and All (2021), In November 2022, production moved to Abu Dhabi, UAE, with Pugh finishing her scenes later that month. Filming wrapped on December 12, 2022.

Music 
Hans Zimmer returned to compose the film's score after doing so for the previous film. Zimmer had composed over 90 minutes of music prior to the announcement of the film to help give Villeneuve inspirations when writing.

Release 
Dune: Part Two is scheduled to be released on November 3, 2023. It was previously scheduled to be released on October 20, 2023, then later to November 17, 2023, before moving to its current release date to adjust to changes in release schedules from other studios.

Future 
Villeneuve has expressed interest in making a third film based on Dune Messiah, the second novel in the series, adding that the possibility for the film depended on the success of Dune: Part Two. Spaihts also reiterated in March 2022 that Villeneuve had plans for a third film as well as a television spin-off series.

References

External links 
 

Upcoming films
Upcoming sequel films
2020s science fiction adventure films
2023 films
2023 fantasy films
2023 science fiction films
American epic films
American science fiction adventure films
American sequel films
American space adventure films
American space opera films
2020s English-language films
Films about dreams
Films based on American novels
Films based on Dune (franchise)
Films based on science fiction novels
Films directed by Denis Villeneuve
Films scored by Hans Zimmer
Films set in deserts
Films set in the future
Films set on fictional planets
Films shot in Budapest
Films shot in Italy
Films shot in Jordan
Films shot in Norway
Films shot in the United Arab Emirates
Films shot in Veneto
Films with screenplays by Eric Roth
IMAX films
Legendary Pictures films
Planetary romances
Soft science fiction films
Upcoming English-language films
Warner Bros. films
Works by Brian Herbert
Works by Kevin J. Anderson
2020s American films